Amt Schradenland is an Amt ("collective municipality") in the district of Elbe-Elster, in Brandenburg, Germany. Its seat is in Gröden.

The Amt Schradenland consists of the following municipalities:
Gröden
Großthiemig
Hirschfeld
Merzdorf

Demography

References

Schradenland
Elbe-Elster